James Luther Straight (January 31, 1909 – August 20, 1981) served a single term as mayor of Boise, Idaho, from 1939 to 1941.

Sources
Mayors of Boise - Past and Present
Idaho State Historical Society Reference Series, Corrected List of Mayors, 1867-1996

References 

Mayors of Boise, Idaho
1909 births
1981 deaths
20th-century American politicians